Holland House School, Edgware, London, is an independent non-denominational preparatory school for boys and girls from four to eleven years of age. The current headmistress is Mrs. E Brown.

History
In 1974, the Board of Governors, all parents at the time, purchased the school and formed a Charitable Education Trust.

In 1983 the School was enlarged to accommodate 140 children in a purpose-built, modern building.

In 2008/2009, a major refurbishment of the School was completed to provide up-to-date facilities that include a computer suite, an art/drama/music room, interactive Smartboards and new administrative offices. In Spring 2009, the kitchen was relocated to provide space for a new school library.

References

Edgware
Private co-educational schools in London
Private schools in the London Borough of Barnet
Preparatory schools in London